Strausz is a surname. Notable people with the surname include:
Alexander Strausz (1829–1905), Hungarian-American brewer, architect, educator, and cartographer
Gyula Strausz (1880–1949), Hungarian athlete
Ján Strausz (1942–2017), Slovak footballer
Otto P. Strausz (1924–2019), Hungarian-born Canadian chemist
Robert Strausz-Hupé (1903–2002), Austrian-born American diplomat

See also
Strauss